The Ranjha are a Jat tribe found in  British India and now in present-day Pakistan.

Notable people
Khalid Ranjha, former Law Minister of Pakistan
Mohsin Shahnawaz Ranjha former Minister of State for Parliamentary Affairs and member National Assembly of Pakistan

References

Jat clans of Pakistan
Jat clans of Punjab
Punjabi tribes
Jat tribes
Punjabi-language surnames
Pakistani names